Spin Zone II is an EP by Deathline International, released on April 17, 2020 by Distortion Productions.

Track listing

Personnel
Adapted from the Spin Zone II liner notes.

Deathline International
 Steve Lam (as SLam) – programming, guitars, backing vocals
 James Perry – guitars, backing vocals
 Christian Petke (as Th3Count) – vocals, programming, vocals

Additional performers
 Angela Goodman – backing vocals

Production and design
 John Fryer – producer, engineering

Release history

References

External links 
 Spin Zone II at Discogs (list of releases)
 Spin Zone II at Bandcamp
 Spin Zone II - EP at iTunes

2020 EPs
Deathline International albums